Herina lacustris is a species of picture-winged fly in the genus Herina of the family Ulidiidae found in France, Portugal, Spain, Morocco, and Algeria.`

References

Ulidiidae
Insects described in 1826
Diptera of Europe
Diptera of Africa